Terror Tract is a 2000 American dark comedy/horror anthology film directed by Lance W. Dreesen and Clint Hutchison.

Plot

"Make Me an Offer" (frame)
The frame features John Ritter as real-estate agent Bob Carter who tries to sell a variety of homes to a young couple, the Doyles. Each home comes with a horror story associated with it. As the film progresses with each new home, Carter becomes more desperate to close a deal but keeps failing because of his commitment to have "full disclosure" about all the grisly occurrences that happened within each home, causing the Doyles to reject his deal offers.

"Nightmare"
A businessman named Louis discovers his wife, Sarah, cheating on him with another man, Frank. Louis catches them in the act and plans to shoot Frank and hang Sarah to make it appear like a murder-suicide crime scene. However, a fight ensues and Frank manages to kill Louis before dumping his body into a nearby lake. Sarah begins having recurring dreams about Louis as a water-drenched corpse coming home and strangling her. Frank and Sarah start getting paranoid when one of Louis's drinking buddies, Clay, who also happens to be cop, starts coming around and asking questions. The couple finds Louis's car on the street without the keys, realizing they were left in Louis's pants pocket at the bottom of the lake. Frank goes to the lake and jumps in to retrieve the keys so they can dispose of the car. When Sarah sees wet footprints in front of the house and hears the soggy steps nearing her bedroom door, much like in her recurring nightmares, she shoots through the door with the shotgun (the same one Louis used and was eventually killed with) only to discover it was Frank at her door returning from the lake with the retrieved keys. The next morning, when the police arrive with Clay in tow, they find Frank shot to death and Sarah hanging from the ceiling, just as Louis had intended in the beginning. The police notice something odd at the murder-suicide crime scene: Sarah's body is drenched in water.

"Bobo"
The Gatleys are the perfect family. The father, Ron, and his daughter, Jennifer, have a close bond. One day, Jennifer finds a small monkey wearing organ grinder attire in their tree, names it Bobo, and persuades her father to allow her to keep him until they can find his owner. Jennifer and Bobo begin forming a close bond while her bond with her father begins to weaken. Ron notices this and begins to grow suspicious of Bobo. The Gatleys' pet dog, Max, chases Bobo through the house before Bobo throws an object at Max's head, injuring the dog. Ron becomes livid and demands the monkey be put outside. When Jennifer defies her father, and Ron's wife, Carol, asks that he compromise, Ron agrees as long as Bobo gets a cage. When Ron attempts to put Bobo in the cage, Bobo bites his hand which leads to Ron demanding the monkey to be removed completely. He eventually gets Bobo in the cage and taunts the monkey, alongside Max who growls at the monkey, and promises to euthanize Bobo. The next morning, Ron discovers Max stabbed to death, the cage door open, and Bobo missing. Ron hides Max's body in the garage. Ron asks his wife and daughter to leave the home immediately, which they do. Now left alone at home, Ron calls the police but they refer him to the local pound dispatcher. Ron bribes the pound dispatcher to get the monkey out of his house. After burying Max in the back yard, Ron goes inside the house to find the pound dispatcher stabbed to death as well. He hides the pound dispatcher's body in the garage. When they return home and see Ron shooting at the monkey, both Carol and Jennifer now doubt Ron's sanity. While the family sleeps, Ron sets up a bear trap only for Bobo to trick him into thinking he had been trapped. While Ron investigates the bear trap, Bobo kills Carol by cutting her throat in bed. Now off the deep end, Ron goes after Bobo with the shotgun in Jennifer's room. As Bobo and Ron struggle in a fight, Ron loses the gun and Jennifer retrieves it. Ron pins Bobo to the ground and tells his daughter to give him the gun so he can end it. Jennifer shoots Ron instead. Back in the present time, Bob Carter tells the Doyles that the police believe Ron was responsible for the killings, and Jennifer shot him in self-defense, never saying another word after that since she became catatonic. As for Bobo, he simply disappeared.

"Come To Granny"
Sean, a troubled teenager with psychic abilities, visits Dr. Corey, a therapist, in her office after hours to tell her of his visions in which he sees The Granny Killer killing his victims shortly before they happen. When he has these visions, he has debilitating fits that cause him to lose control. One vision caused him to fall in the shower and vomit. Another vision caused him to nearly drown his girlfriend while they swam in his family's pool. The third vision caused him to nearly collide head-on with a truck while driving, but it also prompted him to call the police since the vision was of his girlfriend getting murdered by The Granny Killer. Hoping to get there in time, he races to his girlfriend's house only to find her dismembered body parts strewn through the house. Sean reveals to Dr. Corey that she is The Granny Killer's next victim based on his most recent vision. Sean begins to reach for inside his jacket. Dr. Corey, now believing that Sean is The Granny Killer himself, drives Sean down onto a receipt letter spike on her desk and runs out of the office, heading for the elevators. As she anxiously waits for the elevator to reach her floor, Sean begins slowly coming towards her, badly wounded by the receipt letter spike jutting out of his chest. As both he and the elevator reach their destinations, Sean pulls the receipt letter spike from his chest, pulls out a gun to hand to Dr. Corey, but loses consciousness, and both he and the gun fall to the floor. At the same time, the elevator doors open, revealing The Granny Killer standing inside with a meat cleaver. Dr. Corey screams as the meat cleaver swings towards her.

"Make Me an Offer" (conclusion)
The Doyles refuse to buy any of the houses Bob Carter offers them because of the horror stories involved with each one. Carter realizes he failed to meet the deadline when his cell phone rings and the voice on the other side tells him Carter's wife and son are there on the other end of the phone. Carter's son gets on the phone and begs his father to close a deal now. Driven insane, Carter stabs Mr. Doyle in the neck, and as Mr. Doyle collapses to the floor with blood spurting from his neck, Carter begins stabbing him in the back. A horrified Mrs. Doyle runs out of the house to see a neighbor mowing over a cat buried neck-deep into the lawn. As she gets in the car to drive off, Carter appears at the driver's side window with bloody papers in his hand begging her to close the deal. As Mrs. Doyle drives off while screaming, Bobo the murderous monkey appears on her windshield, a woman shoots her husband in a driveway, an old woman smiles at her while a human leg sticks out of her trash can, and other murderous chaos occurs as Mrs. Doyle drives away from the hellish neighborhood.

Cast

 John Ritter as Bob Carter
 David DeLuise as Allen Doyle
 Allison Smith as Mary Ann Doyle
 Rachel York as Sarah Freemont
 Carmine Giovinazzo as Frank Sarno
 Fredric Lehne as Louis Freemont
 Wade Williams as Clay Hendricks
 Bryan Cranston as Ron Gatley
 Katelin Petersen as Jennifer Gatley
 Jodi Harris as Carol Gatley
 Marcus Bagwell as Pound Dispatcher
 Brenda Strong as Dr. Helen Corey
 Will Estes as Sean Goodwin
 Lance W. Dreesen  as Granny Killer (Also co-director; credited as "?")
 Carl Strano as Chief Of Police
 Jeff Ricupito as Police Officer
 Brent Strachan as Police Officer
 Julieann Getman as Police Officer
 Harrison Held as Medical Examiner
 Shonda Farr as Jasmine
 Barbara Jansen as Margaret Goodwin
 Jerry Day as Robert Goodwin
 Branwen Mayfair as Woman Victim
 Lynda Kay as Teacher
 Rafaella Forero as Cleaning Woman
 Allen Simpson as Jasmine's Friend
 Kim Correll as Housewife
 Kelli Mix as Stroller Mom
 Aaron J. Alberts as Lawnmower Man
 Virginia Darragh as Driveway Grandma
 Cathy Hutchison as Gun Toting Housewife
 Paul E. Short as Jogger
 Ray Lykins as Car Driver
 Katie Seals as Neighbor
 Kendall Green as Neighbor
 Laura Bryant as Neighbor

External links

2000 films
2000 horror films
2000 television films
2000 comedy horror films
2000 psychological thriller films
American horror anthology films
American comedy horror films
American television films
Films scored by Brian Tyler
2000 comedy films
2000s English-language films
2000s American films